Camba may refer to:

The Camba people of Bolivia
Camba Busch, nickname of Germán Busch, Bolivian former president
The China–Australia Migratory Bird Agreement, a bird migration treaty
Cambridge Brain Analysis (CamBA), a brain analysis software

Places
Camba, Ohio in the United States